Mellery is a village of Wallonia and a district of the municipality of Villers-la-Ville, located in the province of Walloon Brabant, Belgium.

Former municipalities of Walloon Brabant
Sub-municipalities of Villers-la-Ville